Dakshina Mookambika may refer to Saraswati temples in Kerala, India:

 Dakshina Mookambika Temple North Paravur, a temple in the town of North Paravur, Ernakulam district
 Panachikkadu Temple, a temple in the village Panachikkad, Kottayam district
 Sri Dhakshina Mookambika Temple, a temple located at Kulangarakkonam, Machel P.O, Thiruvananthapuram district